Nelson Alcides Cabrera  (born 18 July 1967 in Canelones) is a Uruguayan former footballer.

Club career
Cabrera played for Estudiantes de La Plata in the Primera División de Argentina.

International career
Cabrera made 23 appearances for the senior Uruguay national football team from 1988 to 1993, including three 1994 FIFA World Cup qualifying matches. He played for Uruguay at the Copa América 1993.

References

External links

1967 births
Living people
People from Canelones Department
Uruguayan footballers
Uruguay international footballers
1993 Copa América players
Danubio F.C. players
Rampla Juniors players
Estudiantes de La Plata footballers
Uruguayan expatriate footballers
Uruguayan Primera División players
Argentine Primera División players
Expatriate footballers in Argentina
Association football defenders